Harinsing railway station is a railway station on the Jasidih–Dumka–Rampurhat line under the Howrah railway division of the Eastern Railway. It is situated at Makrapahari, Dumka district in the Indian state of Jharkhand.

History
Jasidih Junction to Dumka railway line became operational on 12 July 2011 and Dumka to  track was set up in June 2014. The track from Rampurhat to Pinargaria became operational on 25 November 2012. The complete single railway route from Dumka to Rampurhat, including Harinsing railway station became operational on 4 June 2015.

References

Howrah railway division
Railway stations in Dumka district